Metropolis Records is a record label based in Belgrade, Serbia.

Formed in 1994, the label is mainly oriented towards rock music, and has released albums by a great number of notable acts of the Serbian rock scene.

Artists 
Some of the artist currently signed to Metropolis Records, or have been so in the past, include:

Bajaga i Instruktori
Bjesovi
Block Out
Deca Loših Muzičara
Dža ili Bu
Džukele
Eyesburn
Goblini
Kasandrin Glas
Kristali
The Kuguars
Kanda, Kodža i Nebojša
Obojeni Program
Orthodox Celts
Rambo Amadeus
Ritam Nereda
Sunshine
Van Gogh
Veliki Prezir

References
 Metropolis Records at Discogs

See also
 List of record labels

Serbian record labels
Record labels established in 1994
Rock record labels
Serbian rock music